The 2000 EuroTel Slovak Indoor was a women's tennis tournament played on indoor hard courts at the Sibamac Arena in Bratislava, Slovakia that was part of the Tier IV category of the 2000 WTA Tour. It was the second edition of the tournament and was held from 23 October until 29 October 2000. Wildcard Dája Bedáňová won the singles title.

Champions

Singles

 Dája Bedáňová defeated  Miriam Oremans, 6–1, 5–7, 6–3
 It was Bedáňová's only singles title of her career.

Doubles

 Karina Habšudová /  Daniela Hantuchová defeated  Petra Mandula /  Patricia Wartusch, walkover

References

External links
 ITF tournament edition details
 Tournament draws

WTA Bratislava
2000 in Slovak women's sport
2000 in Slovak tennis